"I Want You" is the second single released by Australian actress and singer Toni Pearen. Released in March 1993, the song peaked at number 10 on the Australian ARIA Singles Chart on 23 May 1993, spending 16 weeks in the top 50, and was certified gold during its 10th week in the top 20. "I Want You" garnered Toni Pearen an ARIA Award nomination for Best Pop Release in 1994, her only ARIA nomination.

Background
Toni Pearen had launched her music career in 1992 with the release of her top-10 debut single "In Your Room", after having been a popular cast member of the Australian drama series E Street. After the success her fellow E Street co-star Melissa Tkautz had with her number one single "Read My Lips", Pearen was quickly signed to Mushroom Records and started recording songs.

Track listings
Australian CD single
 "I Want You"
 "I Got the Vibe"

Australian CD digipak and cassette single
A1. "I Want You"
A2. "I Got the Vibe"
B1. "I Want You" (extended mix)
B2. "I Want You" (extended dub)

Charts

Weekly charts

Year-end charts

Certifications

References

1993 singles
1993 songs
Mushroom Records singles
Toni Pearen songs